Chen Xingxu (born 31 March 1996) is a Chinese actor. He is known for his roles as Yang Kang in  The Legend of the Condor Heroes (2017) and Gu Xiaowu / Li Chengyin in Goodbye My Princess (2019).

Early life and education
Chen Xingxu was born on 31 March 1996 in Shenyang, Liaoning, China. He was recruited by a scout when he was 3 years old in the park, and began to shoot advertisements. He shot his first TV series at the age of 4. 

Chen enrolled in the Performance Department (Acting Department) of the Central Academy of Drama in 2014 and graduated in 2018.

Career

2001–2010: Beginnings as child actor
Chen first appeared as child actor in the 2001 TV series A Passionate Life  which stars Golden Horse award winning actress-Lü Liping.

In 2005, he participated in the military war drama The Door to the Wind. In 2006, he starred as Pan Dongzi in the modern children TV series Sparkling Red Star. In 2007, he starred in the historical series The Legend of Meng Li Ju, playing the role of young crown prince. In 2010, he starred in the romance film The Love of Hawthorn Tree.

2017–present: Rising popularity
In 2017, Chen started to gain increased attention and popularity with his role as Yang Kang in the wuxia drama The Legend of the Condor Heroes, adapted from Jin Yong's novel of the same name.

In 2019, Chen starred in the historical romance drama Goodbye My Princess, based on novel by Fei Wo Si Cun. The drama was a success and achieved a cult following. Chen received positive reviews for his portrayal of Gu Xiaowu/Li Chengyin, which led to increased popularity for him. He was then cast in modern drama The Best of Times, followed by military drama The Glory of Youth.

In 2020, Chen starred in the romance fantasy web film The Enchanting Phantom, adapted from the 1987 film A Chinese Ghost Story.

Filmography

Film

Television series

Awards and nominations

References

External links
 

1996 births
Living people
21st-century Chinese male actors
Chinese male television actors
Chinese male film actors
Male actors from Shenyang
Central Academy of Drama alumni